The 2015 PDC Unicorn World Youth Championship was the fifth edition of the PDC World Youth Championship, a tournament organised by the Professional Darts Corporation for darts players aged between 16 and 23.

The knock-out stages from the last 64 to the semi-finals were played in Wigan on 19 October 2015. The final took place on 29 November 2015 before the final of the 2015 Players Championship Finals, which was shown live on ITV4.

Keegan Brown was the defending champion, but he was defeated in the first round by Rowby-John Rodriguez in a repeat of the 2014 final.

The final was contested between Max Hopp and Nathan Aspinall at the Butlins Minehead Resort, Minehead, with Hopp winning 6-5.

Prize money

Qualification
The tournament featured 64 players. The top 51 players in the PDC Development Tour Order of Merit automatically qualified for the tournament, with the top eight players being seeded. They were joined by 13 international qualifiers.

The participants are:

1-51

International qualifiers
  Andrew Briere
  Piyush Chauhan
  Kai Gotthardt
  Fredi Gselmann
  Robbie King
  Thomas Luksch
  Dawson Murschell
  Kenny Neyens
  James O'Toole
  Sarthak Patel
  Stephen Rosney
  Jamie Rundle
  Kevin de Vries

Draw

References

World Youth Championship
PDC World Youth Championship
2015